Blood Money is a 1921 British-Dutch silent crime film directed by Fred Goodwins. The film is also known as The Harper's Mystery.

Cast
 Adelqui Migliar as Victor Legrand
 Dorothy Fane as Felice Deschanel
 Frank Dane as Sarne
 Arthur M. Cullin as Matthew Harper
 Colette Brettel as Marguerite Deschanel
 Harry Ham as Inspector Bell
 Fred Goodwins as Bruce Harper
 Harry Waghalter as Mark Harper
 Coen Hissink as Matthews bediende
 Peggy Linden

External links 
 

1921 films
British silent feature films
Dutch silent feature films
British black-and-white films
Dutch black-and-white films
1921 crime films
Films directed by Fred Goodwins
British crime films
Dutch crime films
1920s British films